Home Again is the 15th studio album by American singer and songwriter Judy Collins, released by Elektra Records in 1984.

Collins had completed the tracks intended for her twentieth album release by Christmas of 1983: however Elektra president Bruce Lundvall recommended that she additionally record the Michael Masser/ Gerry Goffin composition "Home Again": Collins' first two album releases of the 1980s had evinced a marked decline in her popularity and Lundvall hoped that Collins, a product of the folk music boom, might score a career-boosting C&W hit with "Home Again" were she to duet with an established C&W star. Eventually T.G. Sheppard was recruited to partner Collins on "Home Again" with the track being cut in the summer of 1984 - that being the earliest that Michael Masser's schedule permitted his producing the session with Collins and Sheppard - and the Home Again album and its title cut being released in September 1984. The "Home Again" single would in fact prove a mild C&W chart success stalling at No. 57 and the Home Again album became Collins' first to fall short of the Billboard 200 album chart since her first two albums, issued in respectively 1962 and 1963, signalling Collins' departure from Elektra, who had issued all twenty of her albums.

Track listing 
 "Only You" (Vince Clarke) – 3:22
 "Sweetheart on Parade" (Elton John, Gary Osborne) – 4:42
 "Everybody Works in China" (Henry Gross) – 4:24
 "Yellow Kimono" (Graham Lyle) – 4:58
 "From Where I Stand" (Amanda McBroom) – 3:36
 "Home Again" (duet with T. G. Sheppard) (Gerry Goffin, Michael Masser) – 3:36
 "Shoot First" (Collins) – 6:10
 "Don't Say Love" (Randy Goodrum, Brent Maher) – 4:10
 "Dream On" (Collins) – 4:23
 "The Best is Yet To Come" (Clifford T. Ward) – 2:42

Personnel
Judy Collins  – vocals, guitar, keyboards, background vocals
Adrienne Albert – background vocals
Tony Battaglia – bass, guitar
Thomas Bogdan – background vocals
Henry Gross – background vocals
Dave Grusin – synthesizer, percussion, piano, keyboards, drum programming
Dann Huff – guitar
Anthony Jackson – bass
Paul Jackson Jr. – guitar
Randy Kerber – keyboards
Steve Khan – guitar
Hugh McCracken – guitar
Yolanda McCullough – background vocals
Chris Parker – drums
Lee Ritenour – guitar
T.G. Sheppard – background vocals
Terry Textor – background vocals
Ed Walsh – Fairlight
Buddy Williams – drums

References

Judy Collins albums
1984 albums
Albums produced by Michael Masser
Elektra Records albums